Eniola Ajao  is a Nigerian actress from Epe who has acted in over 75 films. She is known for her dynamism and versatility on set in her role delivery.

Personal life
Ajao and her twin sister are the youngest siblings of her parents' six children. The twin celebrates their birthday on 21 January. Growing up Ajao attended Saint Michael’s Anglican Primary School and Army Secondary School in Epe. According to Ajao although she wanted to make her parents proud, she dreamed of being an actress since she was young. Ajao would go on to attend Yaba College of Technology and then the University of Lagos where she would earn her degree in accounting. Eniola Ajao gave birth to a son named Ayomide Okikiola Daniel on 17 May 2002.

Despite numerous rumors, she is not in a relationship with frequent collaborator Odunlade Adekola.

Acting career
Ajao's first film role would be in 2004 where she was cast in the film Ìgbà Aìmọ̀. Other films she has acted in include Eniola, Erin Orin, and Daramola. She starred in the 2018 film The Vendor. Ajao played the lead role of yeye Alara  released in December 2018.

She was nominated for Best Actress in a Supporting Role in a Yoruba-language film at the 2015 Best of Nollywood Awards, but she did not win the award.

Filmography 

 The vendor (2018)
 Yeye Alara (2018)
 Olokiki Oru (2019)
 Blackout (2021)
 Ajibade (2021)
 Wasila Reloaded (2022)
 Omoge Carwash (2022)

See also
List of Yoruba people

References

Living people
Nigerian film actresses
Actresses from Osun State
Yoruba actresses
Yaba College of Technology alumni
University of Lagos alumni
Year of birth missing (living people)
Actresses in Yoruba cinema